This is a list of listed buildings in Svendborg Municipality, Denmark.

''Note:: This list is incomplete. A complete list of listed buildings in Svendborg Municipality can be found on Danish Wikipedia.

The list

5700 Svendborg

5762 Vester Skerninge

5771 Stenstrup

5881 Skårup Fyn

5884 Gudme

5874 Hesselager

5882 Vejstrup

Delisted buildings

References

External links

 Danish Agency of Culture

 
Svendborg